Edgar Herman Munzel (January 14, 1907 – October 4, 2002) was an American sportswriter who covered baseball for the Chicago Herald-Examiner and Chicago Sun-Times from 1929 to 1973.

Biography
Munzel first worked for the Chicago Herald-Examiner part-time in 1922 at age 15. After graduating from high school in 1925, he attended Northwestern University for two years. He started working full-time for the Herald-Examiner in 1927, and began covering the Chicago White Sox in 1929. He later move to the Chicago Sun-Times and covered both the White Sox and the Chicago Cubs until retiring in October 1973. During his career, he covered 34 World Series and 36 Major League Baseball All-Star Games. In his retirement, he moved to Williamsburg, Virginia.

Munzel served as president of the Baseball Writers' Association of America (BBWAA) at one time, and in 1977 was voted the J. G. Taylor Spink Award by the organization. He was honored in ceremonies at the National Baseball Hall of Fame in August 1978. Munzel died in October 2002.

References

External links
Interview with James Enright, Edgar Munzel, February 24, 1977 (audio) via kentuckyoralhistory.org

1907 births
2002 deaths
People from White County, Indiana
Northwestern University alumni
Sportswriters from Illinois
Writers from Chicago
Chicago Sun-Times people
BBWAA Career Excellence Award recipients